Frankfurt am Main Messe station is an S-Bahn station in Frankfurt am Main, Germany, in the district of Bockenheim in the middle of the Frankfurt Trade Fair grounds. The station was opened in 1999 to improve the fair's public transport connections. It consists of two platform tracks facing a central platform. Constructing the platform was a complex procedure as the space between the tracks had to be enlarged. The road next to the line had to be moved and a bridge had to be rebuilt.

Services 
The station is served by S-Bahn lines S3, S4, S5 and S6. Intercity and regional trains run past on the Main Weser tracks, which have no platforms at Messe.

References

Rhine-Main S-Bahn stations
Railway stations in Frankfurt
Railway stations in Germany opened in 1999